Edwin Wood may refer to:
Edwin Wood (cricketer) (1868–?), English cricketer
Edwin Orin Wood (1861–1918), American politician in Michigan
Carl Wood (Edwin Carlyle Wood, 1929–2011), Australian gynaecologist